The following lists events that happened during 1994 in Singapore.

Incumbents
President: Ong Teng Cheong
Prime Minister: Goh Chok Tong

Events

January
1 January
SBC Channel 5 officially introduced and launched new logo and slogan for a new look "Where It All Happens!" and became the first channel in Singapore to become a full-fledged English-language channel with the television programme Tellymatch: Running On 5 at 7:30am SST, Tellymatch: Style Alive On 5 at 2:00pm SST and Tellymatch: Finale On 5 at 1:30am SST. News in English was officially launched new split into two new English television news bulletin programmes includes:
"News 5 at Seven (now Asia Tonight)" an English-language main flagship evening news programme officially opened on New Year's Day 1994 from 7:00pm to 7:30pm SST.
"News 5 Tonight (now News Tonight and Singapore Tonight)" officially became a late news bulletin on SBC Channel 5 aired daily from 10:30pm to 11:00pm SST.
Malay programmes were transferred from SBC Channel 5 to SBC Channel 12. 
News in Malay was officially renamed as "Berita 12" was formally premiered on SBC Channel 12 on the same night now extended from 20 to 30 minutes and aired daily from 7:30pm to 8:00pm SST.
Performance artist Josef Ng performs Brother Cane, leading to an arts funding ban by the government for a decade.
Radio Singapore International (RSI) is launched as Singapore's first international shortwave radio station.
4 January - The Straits Times Industrials Index hits a record high of 2471.90 points, now-former record has been surpassed in 2000 with a record high of 2582.94.
22 January – Junction 8 is officially opened.

February
1 February – SBC Channel 12 officially introduced and launched new logo and slogan "Something Special" for a new look.

March
2 March – The extension of the CISCO headquarters starts construction. When completed, it will have cash processing facilities and a computer disaster recovery centre.
8 March – The first 2G networks are launched in Singapore.
13 March – The National Service Resort and Country Club is officially opened.
26 March – Singapore wins the bid to host the 1999 Rotary Convention.

April
1 April – The Goods and Services Tax (GST) is first introduced with a tax rate of 3%.

May
5 May – United States media reports on the caning incident of American teenager Michael P. Fay who was convicted for vandalism.
21 May – A Singapore Police Force officer, Corporal Hoi Kim Heng, 24, dies after being stabbed in the neck during the attempted arrest of drug abuser Soh Loo Ban. His companion, Corporal Tan Huang Yee, recovers from his injuries.
23 May – Corporal Tan Huang Yee is given a rare field promotion to the rank of sergeant, while Corporal Hoi Kim Heng is conferred the same award posthumously.
26 May – The Night Safari is officially opened.
28 May – SBC Channel 8 officially introduced and launched new logo and slogan for a new look "追潮流，看世界，第八波道最亲切" with the television programme Be A Part On 8 at 10:00pm SST.
29 May - After revamp SBC Channel 8, the channel officially introduced and launched new logo and slogan for a new look "追潮流，看世界，第八波道最亲切" was completed and successful on one night past, News in Tamil was officially renamed "Tamil News (Tamil Seithi)" was formally premiered on SBC Channel 8 on the same night now extended from 10 to 20 minutes and aired daily from 6:30pm to 6:50pm SST. News in Mandarin was officially launched new split into two new Mandarin television news bulletin programmes includes
The premiere of "News Brief in Mandarin (新闻简报) (now Hello Singapore (狮城有约) and Singapore Today (狮城6点半))" a 10-minute evening news summary in Mandarin on SBC Channel 8 aired daily from 6:50pm to 7:00pm SST. 
"News in Mandarin (第八新闻) (now News Tonight (晚间新闻))" officially became a main flagship evening news programme in Mandarin on SBC Channel 8 aired daily from 10:00pm to 10:30pm SST.
30 May - Singaporean Mandarin very first sketch comedy, situation comedy or comedy realty television show, Comedy Night (搞笑行动) was host/presenter by Jack Neo and aired on SBC Channel 8.
31 May – The Great Singapore Sale is launched.

June
6 June – Known as the Oriental Hotel Murder, a Japanese tourist, Madam Fujii Isae, 49, is found murdered in her hotel room at the Oriental Hotel.
9 June – The biggest single robbery to strike a private home occurs at a property in Bukit Timah, in which S$6 million worth of valuables were stolen. All five men involved in the armed robbery were subsequently arrested.

July
1 July – SingTel launches SingNet, Singapore's first ISP.
21 July – The design for the new arts centre is unveiled, with the name of the facility called the Esplanade - Theatres on the Bay, which will be finished by 2000. It opened in 2002.

August
29 August – "AM Singapore" as Singapore's first English-language breakfast programme begins on TCS Channel 5 aired live on Monday to Friday at 6:00am SST.

September
1 September – SingTel launched its fully digitalised telecom network.
2 September – Tuas Naval Base is officially opened.
16 September – A sergeant with the Republic of Singapore Navy, Chong Peh Choong, 26, kills his three children aged between 3 and 10 before failing in his attempts to kill his wife and himself. He was jailed for life.
23 September
Dutchman Johannes van Damme is executed for drug trafficking.
FM97.2 starts broadcast.

October
1 October
Singapore Broadcasting Corporation (SBC) was privatised into a new holding company Singapore International Media (SIM Group of Companies) with three business units: Television Corporation of Singapore (TCS), Radio Corporation of Singapore (RCS) and Television Twelve (TV12).
Singapore Broadcasting Authority is formed.
 12 October - Singapore English very first television drama series, Masters of the Sea was aired on TCS Channel 5.
15 October – Madam Mona Koh, 46, a mamasan, survives two gunshot wounds at Katong People's Complex.
22 October - The last National Registration Identity Card (NRIC) replacement exercise takes place in Choa Chu Kang Community Club, marking the end of a three-year replacement programme. For those who did not re-register yet, a grace period will be given until 1995. From 1 January 1996, the old laminated NRICs will be invalid.
31 October to 3 November – A three-day debate on ministerial salaries ensues. Eventually, the white paper is approved on 3 November.
31 October – Power98FM is launched by SAFRA.

November
November – Tiong Bahru Plaza opens to the public.
21 November – The Singapore People's Party is formed after several members broke off from the Singapore Democratic Party.
30 November – Police officer Senior Staff Sergeant Boo Tiang Huat, 47, dies after sustaining an axe wound to the head while conducting routine vehicular inspection at Newton Road. He was given a field promotion to the rank of Station Inspector posthumously.

December
31 December - Panasonic New Year Countdown Celebrations is an annual multi-tiered event held every New Year's Eve in Raffles Hotel and Changi Airport its main events are pyrotechnic displays. It was officially launched by President of Singapore Ong Teng Cheong including from the midnight countdown New Year to midnight firework New Year both of which are terrestrial televised nationally free-to-air on Television Corporation of Singapore Channel 5 from 11:00pm to 12:15am SST, lasting 75-minutes and sponsored by Panasonic, Seiko and Toyota.

Date unknown
 The Singapore Heart Centre starts operations.

Births
 1 January – Carrie Wong, actress.
 1 October - Linying, the singer for NDP 2021 theme song 'The Road Ahead'. 
 5 November – Timothee Yap, national sprinter.
 13 November – Andrew Tang, racing driver.

Deaths
 24 January – F. A. Chua – Supreme Court Judge (b. 1913).
 11 February – Gog Sing Hooi – Pioneer watercolour painter (b. 1933).
 24 August – Ee Peng Liang – Businessman and philanthropist (b. 1913).
 8 November – Kwek Hong Png – Founder of Hong Leong Group (b. 1913).
 10 December – Jamit Singh – Trade unionist (b. 1929).

References

 
Singapore
Years in Singapore